Holwick is a small village in Teesdale, north-east England. Located in the Pennine hills, it consists of a few houses spread along a road in the pattern of a linear settlement. As the population taken at the 2011 Census was less than 100, details are maintained in the parish of Lunedale.

Being south of the Tees, Holwick lies within the historic boundaries of the North Riding of Yorkshire, but along with the rest of the former Startforth Rural District it was transferred to County Durham for administrative and ceremonial purposes on 1 April 1974, under the provisions of the Local Government Act 1972. In May 2013, the newly registered flag of the North Riding was first unveiled at the village, owed to it being one of the most northerly settlements in Yorkshire.

It has a public house, the Strathmore Arms, and a campsite. Holwick sits not far from the south bank of the River Tees, about 2 miles north-west of Middleton-in-Teesdale and opposite Newbiggin, both villages on the other side of the river.  Nearby are the High Force and Low Force waterfalls. The surrounding landscape is high moorland and fells.

Geography and administration

Civic history
Holwick is part of the Bishop Auckland parliamentary constituency, which is represented in parliament by Dehenna Davison (Conservative).

The local police force is Durham Constabulary. Holwick is in the Wear and Tees division and its nearest police station is in Barnard Castle.

Location
 Grid reference: NY9026*
 Latitude and longitude:  (54.64, −2.15)
 Elevation: 270 m (885 feet)
 Road access: Minor road off B6277
 Rail access: Appleby and Bishop Auckland, both approx.  by road
 Nearest large village: Middleton-in-Teesdale, 
 Nearest town: Barnard Castle,

History
The earliest evidence of habitation in the area comes from Mesolithic microliths dating back at least 6000 years. The people who left them, however, were not settled in the area, but hunted there during the summer. Agriculture began in the Neolithic period, and the remains of buildings have been found from the Bronze Age. The present-day village of Holwick was first recorded in 1235, though the origin of the name is uncertain, believed to mean either "dairy farm in a hollow" or "in the holly". In addition to hill farming of sheep, lead mining and iron smelting was conducted in the mediæval period, with lead mining and stone quarrying increasing in importance throughout Teesdale in the 18th century. A suspension bridge was built across the Tees near Holwick in 1704, and collapsed in 1802, killing one. It was repaired but finally replaced in 1830. Substantial quarrying and lead mining did not continue into the 20th century, and the economy of the village has since returned to sheep farming.

References

Durham County Council & Northumberland County Council. "Local History: Holwick (County Durham)". Keys to the Past. Retrieved 12 January 2005.

External links

Villages in County Durham
History of Yorkshire